Llwydiarth-Esgob is an area in the  community of Rhosybol, Ynys Môn, Wales, which is 137.3 miles (220.9 km) from Cardiff and 218.1 miles (350.9 km) from London. In the 18th century the poet Hugh Hughes lived on his estate here.

See also
List of localities in Wales by population

References

Villages in Anglesey